"Thank God" is a hymn written by Fred Rose and released as a posthumous single by Hank Williams in 1955 on MGM Records.  Rose had produced Williams' records and published his songs through his company Acuff-Rose. The Roy Acuff hymn "The Battle of Armageddon" was the B-side.  "Thank God" was recorded between August 1948 and May 1949 at KWKH studio in Shreveport, Louisiana when the singer appeared on the Johnny Fair Syrup radio show. Williams dubbed himself "The Ol' Syrupy Sopper" and performed alone with his guitar.

References

Hank Williams songs
1948 songs
1955 singles
Songs written by Fred Rose (songwriter)
MGM Records singles